The Jamaat al Muslimeen (also transliterated as Jamaat-ul Muslimeen or Jama'at al-Muslimeen, "School of Muslims", "Group of Muslims", "The Muslim Group", "The Muslim Assembly", "The Muslim Society", "The Muslim Community") is a radical extremist Islamist fundamentalist group in Trinidad and Tobago. 

The organisation is responsible for the Jamaat al Muslimeen coup attempt of July 1990, in which its leader, Imam Yasin Abu Bakr, led members of the Jamaat in an attempted coup d'état against the unpopular Government of Trinidad and Tobago. Over a six-day period members of the government, including then-Prime Minister A.N.R. Robinson, were held hostage at gunpoint, while the group occupied a television station and parliament, and chaos and looting broke out in the streets of the capital, Port of Spain.

Origins
The background for the foundation of movement is a widespread presence of black racism and supremacy, the division of community on the basis of race, the illicit drug trade and ideology of extremist jihad. The next step was a development of a militant Islamic discourse which insisted that liberation for especially Afro-Trinidadians and Tobagonians was only found within the ambit of Islam. As the result, a group called Jamaat al Muslimeen (JAM), an Afro-Trinidadian Muslim movement, was founded.

Coup attempt

In July 1990, forty-two insurgents stormed the parliament, taking Prime Minister Arthur Napoleon Raymond (ANR) Robinson and most of his staff hostage. Seventy-two insurgents stormed a local police station, and at 6:00 PM JAM leader Yasin Abu Bakr told the public the government had been overthrown. During the four-day siege in which 24 people were killed, JAM agreed to surrender in exchange for amnesty. Abu Bakr and 114 of his followers were granted presidential pardons, which were later retracted, but no JAM members from the coup have ever served jail time in connection with the attack. 

A court ruling upheld an amnesty agreement obtained during the incarceration of parliament by the group. This led to the non-prosecution of its members for this crime despite the contention that the fact that guns and force were used to obtain said amnesty constituted duress. Subsequent to the attempted coup, it aligned itself publicly first with the United National Congress (in the run-up to the 1995 General Elections) and later with the People's National Movement (PNM), the party which formed the Government of the Republic of Trinidad and Tobago until May 2010.

Other crimes
Before and since those elections, however, present and past members have been connected to or prosecuted for serious violent crimes. These crimes include drug and gang related killings, rape and a spree of kidnappings for ransom of members of the local upper and middle class. The organisation's leader is currently being prosecuted for conspiracy to murder several of the group's former members who had spoken out publicly against the Jamaat al Muslimeen and its practices, and who were suspected of becoming witnesses in legal proceedings against its members.

In 2005, the group was suspected of being linked to a series of bombings in Port-of-Spain; a group member arrested in the United States for attempting to ship 70 assault rifles from Fort Lauderdale to Trinidad.

Abu Bakr was investigated in 2007 when the reports of an attempted bombing attempt at John F. Kennedy (JFK) Airport linked JAM to one of the perpetrators, a Trinidadian national. The suspects reportedly asked Abu Bakr for assistance in carrying out this plot. Abu Bakr and JAM deny any connection to the plot.

In 2014, eleven JAM members allegedly participated in the assassination of Dana Seetahal, an independent senator.  During the trial, a Special Branch intelligence memo featuring an unconfirmed report was leaked to social media. The report indicated that law enforcement feared violence from JAM amid reports the group may have been moving arms in preparation for an attack on police stations. No attack materialised however.

On 14 July 2015, JAM members launched an armed jailbreak of the suspected assassins in the Seetahal case. During a shootout one police officer and one JAM member were killed.

JAM and Abu Bakr’s influence has waned somewhat since the rise of public awareness of ISIS in the region. A total of 89 Trinidadian and Tobagonians have already pledged allegiance to the group and a group of Salafi jihadists attempted to assassinate the prime minister.

Abu Bakr collapsed and died at his home on 21 October 2021 at the age of 80.

References

External links
 Angela Potter, "Trinidad Muslims Being Closely Monitored," Associated Press, November 1, 2001.
 Robin Walker, "Profile: Jamaat al Muslimeen," BBC News, June 3, 2007.

Politics of Trinidad and Tobago
Islamic organisations based in Trinidad and Tobago